Chatsworth Stadium is a multi-purpose stadium in Durban, South Africa.  It is currently used mostly for football matches and serves as the home stadium of Royal AM F.C.

From 1985 until their bankruptcy in 2006 it was the home of Manning Rangers F.C., the champions of the inaugural season of South Africa's Premier Soccer League.

References

External links
Stadium picture
Photos of Stadiums in South Africa at cafe.daum.net/stade

Lamontville Golden Arrows F.C.
Soccer venues in South Africa
Sports venues in Durban
Manning Rangers F.C.